Huinya is a collaboration between the Russian band Leningrad and the British trio The Tiger Lillies. All but two of the songs are Tiger Lillies songs translated into Russian and performed by Leningrad; the remainder are Leningrad songs sung by The Tiger Lillies in English. The album was recorded in 2003 and released in 2005.

The title of the album means "bullshit". The Russian word "huinya" (хуйня) is part of the Russian vulgar slang, mat, and means something useless, wrong or unknown. However, the album was released in Russia under the transliterated title "Huinya" (hence the "H" on the cover), which makes it somewhat less offensive compared to the Cyrillic spelling.

Track listing
"Суд" - Sud - (Judgement) (originally "The Crack of Doom") – 3:10   	
"Рвота" - Rvota - (Vomit) (originally "Fish Heads") – 2:43  	
"Хуйня" - Huinya - (Bullshit) (originally "Crap") – 2:05  	
"Водка" - Vodka – 1:06 (performed by Leningrad and The Tiger Lillies)
"Убийца" - Ubiytsa - (Murderer) (originally "Killer") – 3:56  	
"В ад" - V ad - (To Hell) (originally "Hell") – 2:22  	
"Сука" - Suka - (Bitch) - (originally "Bitch") – 3:13  	
"Псих" - Psikh - ("Psycho") – 1:49 (performed by The Tiger Lillies)
"Алкаш" - Alkash - (Alco) (originally "Swine") – 1:48  	
"Твой мир" - Tvoy mir - (Your World) - (originally "Your World") – 2:14
"Слюни" - Slyuni - (Drool) (originally "Dribble") – 2:30  	
"В баре" - V bare - (In the Bar) (originally "Bastard") – 3:11
"Наше шоу" - Nashe shou - (Our Show) (originally "The Cheapest Show") – 3:18
"Алкаш 2" - Alkash 2 - (Alco 2) (bonus track)" – 1:48

2005 albums
Leningrad (band) albums